Lagorce is a commune in the Ardèche department in southern France.

Geography
The village lies in the middle of the commune, on the right bank of the Salastre, a right tributary of the river Ibie, which flows south through the eastern part of the commune.

Population

See also
 Côtes du Vivarais AOC
Communes of the Ardèche department

References

Communes of Ardèche
Ardèche communes articles needing translation from French Wikipedia